Chak Garia is a neighbourhood located in the eastern part of Garia, in West Bengal, India. It is bounded by Jadavpur to the north, New Garia to the south, Baishnabghata-Patuli Township to the west and Mukundapur, Nayabad to the east. It is primarily famous for the highrises namely, Hiland Park and Bengal Ambuja Upohar.

Transport
Chak Garia is served by many bus routes of Garia which enter through the EM Bypass.
Satyajit Ray metro station, under construction on Kolkata Metro Line 6 network would serve Chak Garia.

Chak Garia is served by the Baghajatin railway station on the Sealdah South section.

Places of interest
 Hiland Park is the tallest residential complex in this area and it is located on Eastern Metropolitan Bypass

See also
 New Garia
 Kolkata Metro Railway Routes (North South Corridor)
 Kolkata Suburban Railway

References

External links
 

Kolkata Metropolitan Area
West Bengal